The 2009–10 season was the 122nd season and their 3rd consecutive season in League One played by Walsall F.C., a football club based in Walsall, West Midlands, England. Along with competing in League One, the club also participated in the FA Cup, League Cup and the Football League Trophy.

Season summary 
Walsall finished 13th in the previous season, with caretaker manager Jimmy Mullen being appointed permanently shortly after the end of the season. However, on 10 January 2009 Mullen was sacked as manager following a run of just four wins in sixteen games.  On 20 January 2009, Chris Hutchins was appointed as Mullen's successor with Martin O'Connor appointed as his assistant.  Walsall finished 10th at the end of the season.

Competitions

League One

Table

Results

FA Cup

Football League Cup

Football League Trophy

Squad

References 

2009-10
2009–10 Football League One by team